The 2017 Horizon League women's soccer tournament was the postseason women's soccer tournament for the Horizon League. It was held from October 30 through November 4, 2017. The quarterfinals of the tournament were held at campus sites, while semifinals and final took place at Engelmann Field in Milwaukee, Wisconsin. The six team single-elimination tournament consisted of three rounds based on seeding from regular season conference play. The Northern Kentucky Norse were the defending champions, but they were eliminated from the 2017 tournament with a 3–2 loss to the IUPUI Jaguars in the semifinals. IUPUI won the tournament by virtue of winning the penalty shoot-out tiebreaking procedure following a tie with the Milwaukee Panthers in the final.

Bracket

Semifinal matchups were determined by the results of the quarterfinals. The #1 seed would play the lowest-remaining seed, while the #2 seed would play the other quarterfinal winner.

Schedule

Quarterfinals

Semifinals

Final

Statistics

Goalscorers 

4 Goals
 Valentine Pursey - IUPUI

1 Goal
 Sarah Colvin - Wright State
 Samantha Duwel - Northern Kentucky
 Tamae Douglas - UIC
 Jessica Frey - Northern Kentucky
 Erin Graefen - Wright State
 Destiny Johnson - Wright State
 Aliani Lorenzo - Cleveland State
 Lourdes Onwuemeka - Milwaukee
 Mackenzie Schill - Milwaukee

See also 
 2017 Horizon League Men's Soccer Tournament

References 

2017 Horizon League women's soccer season
Horizon League Women's Soccer Tournament